This is a list of youngest EuroLeague players since the EuroLeague 2000–01 season, when the competition started to be organized by Euroleague Basketball. The EuroLeague is the European-wide top-tier level men's professional basketball club competition for eligible European basketball clubs. The list does not count any young players from the 1958 season to the 1999–00 season, when the EuroLeague competition was run by FIBA Europe.

Key

Youngest players since the 2000–01 season

See also 
 List of oldest and youngest National Basketball Association players

References

External links 
 

Youngest
EuroLeague,Youngest